Marcelina Herrera, also called Hawelana or Ha-we-la-na, was an American painter from the Zia Pueblo tribe known for her flat painting style and use of pattern. From 1934 to 1937, she studied at the Santa Fe Indian School in Santa Fe, New Mexico at The Studio under Dorothy Dunn. Herrera went on to study at the University of New Mexico in Albuquerque. Her work has been exhibited at the National Gallery of Art in Washington, D.C.

In 1936, Herrera wrote, "The modern Paintings  consist of ceremonies and other dances. They paint the things they do in every day life. Some of the animals and some scenes are similar to Persian paintings. Designs that the modern painters paint are purely abstract. None of the paintings are realistic. Beautiful paintings are produced more and more which emphasizes that the Indian art is rising again."

References

20th-century American painters
20th-century indigenous painters of the Americas
Native American painters
University of New Mexico alumni
Pueblo artists
20th-century American women artists
Painters from New Mexico
Native American women artists
20th-century Native American women
20th-century Native Americans